Jim Finn is the writer/director of what have been called "Utopian comedies." His first feature film Interkosmos (71 minutes, 2006) is about an East German space colonization mission. His second feature La Trinchera Luminosa del Presidente Gonzalo (60 minutes, 2007) is about a day in the life of a Shining Path women's prison cellblock. His third feature The Juche Idea (62 minutes, 2008) is about an artist residency in North Korea. He has been making short films and videos since 1999. His work is available through the Video Data Bank and Facets DVD.

He was born in 1968 in St. Louis, Missouri. He went to graduate school at Rensselaer Polytechnic Institute and studied Creative Writing at the University of Arizona. He teaches video and writing at Emerson College. He started making movies in Chicago in the late 1990s and became a fixture on the microcinema scene. His short videos appeared at festivals like the International Film Festival Rotterdam, New York Underground Film Festival, Chicago Underground Film Festival, Impakt Festival, LA Freewaves and many others. His first feature, Interkosmos premiered at the International Film Festival Rotterdam in 2006 and was called a "retro gust of communist utopianism" in the Village Voice. His second feature made the Top 10 in Experimental Film at the Village Voice in 2007.

His third feature, The Juche Idea has screened at the Museum of Modern Art in New York City, and was produced as part of the Hallwalls Artist-in-Residence Project.

References

External links
 
 Interkosmos official site
Jim Finn official site
New York Underground Film Festival trailer

American film directors
Rensselaer Polytechnic Institute alumni
Living people
1968 births
Writers from St. Louis
University of Arizona alumni
Emerson College faculty
German-language film directors
Artists from Chicago